Syme may refer to:

People
 Colin Syme (1903–1986), Australian medical administrator and innovator
 Connor Syme (born 1995), Scottish professional golfer
 David Syme (1827–1908), Scottish-Australian newspaper proprietor of The Age
 David Syme (pianist) (born 1949), American pianist
 Don Syme, Australian computer scientist, creator of the F# programming language
 Ebenezer Syme (1826–1860), Scottish-Australian journalist, proprietor and manager of The Age
 Geoffrey Syme (1873–1942), son of David Syme, who succeeded his father as proprietor and owner of The Age
 George Adlington Syme (1859–1929), Australian surgeon
 Hugh Syme (GC) (1903–1965), Australian naval officer and bomb disposal operative, and employee of The Age
 Hugh Syme, Canadian musician and a Juno Award-winning graphic artist
 James Syme (1799–1870), pioneering Scottish surgeon
 Jason Syme, Scottish rugby league and rugby union footballer who played in the 1990s and 2000s
 Jennifer Syme (1972–2001), American actress and production assistant
 John Syme (1795–1861), Scottish portrait-painter
 John Thomas Irvine Boswell Syme (1822–1888), British botanist
 Julie Syme, community leader from Kaikōura, New Zealand
 Ronald Syme (1903–1989), New Zealand-born historian of ancient Rome and classicist
 William Smith Syme (1870–1928), Newfoundland-born laryngologist

Fictional characters 
 Syme, a minor character in George Orwell's Nineteen Eighty-Four
 Gabriel Syme, a character in G.K. Chesterton's The Man Who Was Thursday

Other uses
 Syme, Greece (also romanized as Symi), a Greek island and municipality
Battle of Syme
 Syme (mythology), a Greek mythological figure

See also
 SymE toxin, regulated by SymR RNA
Symes, a surname
 Sime (disambiguation)